Deconica pseudobullacea is a species of mushroom in the family Strophariaceae.

References

Strophariaceae
Fungi described in 1924